Parm or PARM may refer to:

 Parmesan cheese, especially in dishes such as chicken parm
 PARM 1 mine, Panzer-Abwehr Richtmine (German, Antitank defense arranging mine)
 Authentic Party of the Mexican Revolution, Partido Auténtico de la Revolución Mexicana (Spanish)
 ParM, a component of the segregation mechanism for the bacterial R1 plasmid
 parm AG, a Swiss software and consulting company
 Persistent Anti-Radiation Missile, an acronym commonly associated with the AGM-136A Tacit Rainbow cruise missile